Proleucinodes  is a genus of moths of the family Crambidae.

Species
Proleucinodes impuralis (C. Felder, R. Felder & Rogenhofer, 1875)
Proleucinodes lucealis (C. Felder, R. Felder & Rogenhofer, 1875)
Proleucinodes melanoleuca (Hampson, 1913)
Proleucinodes xylopastalis (Schaus, 1912)

References

Spilomelinae
Taxa named by Hahn William Capps
Crambidae genera